The Journal of Economic Methodology is a peer-reviewed academic journal in the field of economic methodology, including methodological analyses of the theory and practice of economics, the implications of developments in both the theory and practice of economics, economics's philosophical foundations, the rhetoric of economics, the sociology of economics, and the economics of economics. It is the official journal of the International Network for Economic Method.

References

External links 
 
 International Network for Economic Method

Economics journals
Taylor & Francis academic journals
Publications established in 1994
Quarterly journals
English-language journals